The Las Vegas Strip is a stretch of Las Vegas Boulevard South in Clark County, Nevada, that is known for its concentration of resort hotels and casinos.

Many of the largest hotel, casino, and resort properties in the world are on the Strip, known for its contemporary architecture, lights, and wide variety of attractions. Its hotels, casinos, restaurants, residential high-rises, entertainment offerings, and skyline have established the Strip as one of the most popular and iconic tourist destinations in the world and is one of the driving forces for Las Vegas's economy. Most of the Strip has been designated as an All-American Road, and the North and South Las Vegas Strip routes are classified as Nevada Scenic Byways and National Scenic Byways.

Boundaries

Historically, casinos that were not in Downtown Las Vegas along Fremont Street sat outside the city limits on Las Vegas Boulevard. In 1959, the Welcome to Fabulous Las Vegas sign was built exactly  outside the city limits.

Clark County uses the phrase Resort Corridor to describe the area including Las Vegas Boulevard between 215 Beltway and Sahara Avenue and surrounding areas.

The Sahara is widely considered the Strip's northern terminus, though travel guides typically extend it to the Strat  to the north. Mandalay Bay, just north of Russell Road, is the southernmost resort considered to be on the Strip (the Klondike was the southernmost until 2006, when it was closed, although it was not included in the Strip on some definitions and travel guides). The Strip includes the "Welcome to Fabulous Las Vegas" sign.

History

Early years (1930s–1990s) 
The first casino to be built on Highway 91 was the Pair-o-Dice Club in 1931, but the first full service casino-resort on what is currently called 'The Strip' was the El Rancho Vegas, which opened with 63 bungalow hotel rooms on April 3, 1941. (The 'El Rancho Vegas' showroom and casino were destroyed by a fire in 1960. The El Rancho Vegas bungalows were not damaged, and were rented out until the early 1980's). Its success spawned a second hotel on what would become the Strip, the Hotel Last Frontier in 1942. Organized crime figures such as Bugsy Siegel, originally from New York, later residing in California, took an intense interest in the growing Las Vegas gaming center, and funded another resort- mob financing for the finishing of the Flamingo construction. The Flamingo construction was started by famed Hollywood publisher Billy Wilkerson. The Flamingo casino opened in December 1946, and the hotel opened in March 1947. Wilbur Clark's Desert Inn resort  opened in 1950. The funding for many Las Vegas projects was provided through the American National Insurance Company, which was based in the then-notorious gambling empire of Galveston, Texas. 

Las Vegas Boulevard South was previously called Hwy 91, or the Arrowhead Highway, or Los Angeles Highway. The Strip was named by Los Angeles police officer and businessman Guy McAfee, after his hometown's Sunset Strip in Hollywood.

Unincorporated town
In 1950, Mayor Ernie Cragin of the City of Las Vegas sought to annex the Las Vegas Strip, which was unincorporated Clark County territory, in order to expand the city's tax base to fund his ambitious building agenda and pay down the city's rising debt. Instead, Gus Greenbaum of the Flamingo led a group of casino executives to lobby the Clark County commissioners for town status. Two unincorporated towns were eventually created, Paradise and Winchester. More than two decades later, the Supreme Court of Nevada struck down a 1975 Nevada state law that would have folded the Strip and the rest of the urban areas of Clark County into the City of Las Vegas.

Caesars Palace was established in 1966. In 1968, Kirk Kerkorian purchased the Flamingo and hired Sahara Hotels Vice President Alex Shoofey as president. Alex Shoofey brought along 33 of Sahara's top executives. The Flamingo was used to train future employees of the International Hotel, which was under construction. Opening in 1969, the International Hotel, with 1,512 rooms, began the era of mega-resorts. The International is known as Westgate Las Vegas today. 

The first MGM Grand Hotel and Casino, also a Kerkorian property, opened in 1973 with 2,084 rooms. At the time, this was one of the largest hotels in the world by number of rooms. The Rossiya Hotel built in 1967 in Moscow, for instance, had 3,200 rooms; however, most of the rooms in the Rossiya Hotel were single rooms of 118 sq. ft (roughly 1/4 size of a standard room at the MGM Grand Resort). On November 21, 1980, MGM Grand suffered the worst resort fire in the history of Las Vegas as a result of electrical problems, killing 87 people. It reopened eight months later. In 1986, Kerkorian sold the MGM Grand to Bally Manufacturing, and it was renamed Bally's.

Mega-resorts
The opening of The Mirage in 1989 set a new level to the Las Vegas experience, as smaller hotels and casinos made way for the larger mega-resorts.  Some of the key features of The Mirage included tropical landscapes with waterfalls, an erupting volcano, restaurants with world-class chefs, and a show with illusionists Siegfried & Roy.  In the 1990s, more than 12 new hotels opened, including themed hotels like the Luxor, Excalibur, and Mandalay Bay.   At $1.7B, the most expensive hotel in the world at the time, The Bellagio, was built in the 1990s.  These huge facilities offer entertainment and dining options, as well as gambling and lodging. This change affected the smaller, well-known and now historic hotels and casinos, like the Dunes, the Sands, and the Stardust.  In 1993, the launch of the Mystère show at the new Treasure Island hotel by Cirque du Soleil marked a key point in transforming Las Vegas Strip entertainment.

In an effort to attract families, resorts offered more attractions geared toward youth, but had limited success.  The Wet 'n Wild water park opened in 1985 and was located on the south side of the Sahara hotel. It closed at the end of the 2004 season and was later demolished.  The current MGM Grand opened in 1993 with MGM Grand Adventures Theme Park, but the park closed in 2000 due to lack of interest. Similarly, in 2003 Treasure Island closed its own video arcade and abandoned the previous pirate theme, adopting the new ti name.

In addition to the large hotels, casinos and resorts, the Strip is home to many attractions, such as M&M's World, Adventuredome and the Fashion Show Mall. Starting in the mid-1990s, the Strip became a popular New Year's Eve celebration destination.

2000–present

With the opening of Bellagio, Venetian, Palazzo, Wynn and Encore resorts, the strip trended towards the luxurious high end segment through most of the 2000s, while some older resorts added major expansions and renovations, including some de-theming of the earlier themed hotels. High end dining, specialty retail, spas and nightclubs increasingly became options for visitors in addition to gambling at most Strip resorts. There was also a trend towards expensive residential condo units on the strip.

It consists of hotel, casino, condo, retail, art, business and other uses on the site. CityCenter is currently the largest such complex in the world. Construction began in April 2006, with most elements of the project opened in late 2009. Also in 2006, the Las Vegas Strip lost its longtime status as the world's highest-grossing gambling center, falling to second place behind Macau.

In 2012, the High Roller Ferris wheel and a retail district called The LINQ Promenade broke ground in an attempt to diversify attractions beyond that of casino resorts. Renovations and rebrandings such as The Cromwell Las Vegas and the SLS Las Vegas continued to transform the Strip in 2014. The Las Vegas Festival Grounds opened in 2015. In 2016, T-Mobile Arena, The Park, and the Park Theater opened.

On October 1, 2017, a mass shooting occurred on the Strip at the Route 91 Harvest country music festival, adjacent to the Mandalay Bay hotel. 60 people were killed, and 867 were injured. The murderer was a well known Las Vegas high roller named Stephen Paddock. Paddock's motive was never determined, and he committed suicide after the murders were committed. Paddock used several rifles to shoot guests at the Route 91 Festival. These murders became the deadliest mass shootings in modern United States history.

In 2018, the Monte Carlo Resort and Casino was renamed the Park MGM and in 2019, the SLS changed its name back to Sahara Las Vegas.

In 2021, the Pinball Hall of Fame moved near the "Fabulous Las Vegas" sign at the south end of the Strip. Later that year, Resorts World Las Vegas, the first new hotel-casino built in a decade, opened on the site of the former Stardust Resort and Casino. Resorts World incorporates portions of a previously planned resort known as Echelon Place, which was canceled in 2008.

In 2022, Bally's was renamed the Horseshoe Las Vegas.

Future developments

The MSG Sphere at The Venetian, including a monorail stop, is being built behind The Palazzo and The Venetian. It was scheduled to open in 2021, but has been rescheduled to sometime in 2023.

The Fontainebleau Las Vegas (formerly the JW Marriott Las Vegas Blvd/The Drew Las Vegas) is expected to open in the fourth quarter of 2023.

Dream Las Vegas, a casino and 20-story boutique hotel next to Harry Reid International Airport (formerly McCarran International Airport) began construction in 2022 for an opening in 2024.

Astral Hotels planned to start building Astral, a 34-story, 620-room hotel and casino on the southern Las Vegas Strip, but the project is delayed.

In 2022, businessman Tilman Fertitta received approval to eventually build a 43-story resort at the southeast corner of Harmon Avenue.

The All Net Resort & Arena is expected to open in late 2025. It will include a 23,000 seat retractable roof arena, two hotels and a theatre.

Transportation

Buses 
RTC Transit (previously Citizens Area Transit, or CAT) provides bus service on the Strip with double decker buses known as The Deuce. The Deuce runs between Mandalay Bay at the southern end of the Strip (and to the Welcome to Fabulous Las Vegas sign and South Strip Transfer Terminal after midnight) to the Bonneville Transit Center (BTC) and the Fremont Street Experience in Downtown Las Vegas, with stops near every casino. RTC also operates an express bus called the Strip and Downtown Express (SDX). This route connects the Strip to the Las Vegas Convention Center and Downtown Las Vegas to the north, with stops at selected hotels and shopping attractions (Las Vegas Premium Outlets North & South).

Trams 
Several free trams operate between properties on the west side of the Strip:

Monorail 
While not on the Strip itself, the Las Vegas Monorail runs a 3.9 mile route on the east side of the Strip corridor from Tropicana Avenue to Sahara Avenue, with stops every 4 to 8 minutes at several on-Strip properties including the MGM Grand and the Sahara at each end of the route.  The stations include:

 SAHARA Las Vegas Station
 Westgate Station
 Las Vegas Convention Center Station
 Harrah's/The LINQ Station
 Flamingo/Caesars Palace Station
 Horseshoe/Paris Station
 MGM Grand Station

The monorail began operations in 1995 and originally used two trains from Walt Disney World.  In 2021, the Las Vegas Convention and Visitors Authority (LVCVA) announced plans for purchasing the bankrupt Las Vegas Monorail.

Pedestrian traffic

On a daily basis, there are tens of thousands of pedestrians walking along the Strip at any one time. As of 2019, the daily number of pedestrians on the Strip is approximately 50,000.

Concerning pedestrian safety and to help alleviate traffic congestion at popular intersections, several pedestrian footbridges were erected in 1990s and the first was the Tropicana – Las Vegas Boulevard footbridge. Some feature designs that match the theme of the nearby resorts.  Additional footbridges have been built on Las Vegas Boulevard.  The footbridges include:

 Veer Towers:. Connects Veer Towers, Waldorf Astoria, and Crystals Shopping Center
 Park MGM and T-Mobile Arena Park: Connects MGM and Showcase Mall
 Planet Hollywood: Connects Planet Hollywood, CityCenter, Crystals Shopping Center, and The Cosmopolitan.
 Spring Mountain Road and Las Vegas Blvd. Corner: Connects Treasure Island, The Wynn, Fashion Show Mall, and The Venetian
 Flamingo Road and Las Vegas Blvd. Corner: Connects Bally's, Flamingo, Bellagio, and Caesars Palace
 Las Vegas Blvd and Tropicana Ave Corner. Connects the MGM Grand, New York-New York, Excalibur, and Tropicana

There has been negative feedback from pedestrians about the elevated crosswalks due to need to walk as much as a quarter-mile to reach an intersection to cross the street and to then walk back some distance on the other side of the street to get to their desired destinations.

After a driver drove into pedestrians on the sidewalk in front of Paris Las Vegas and Planet Hollywood in December 2015, 800 bollards began to be installed on Las Vegas Blvd. starting in 2017.  The construction of the bollards resulted in the removal of 49 of the 82 stars of the Las Vegas Walk of Stars.  In 2019, the bollards on Las Vegas Blvd. were shortened due to feedback from drivers that the bollards were obstructing street views.  283 of the 4,500 bollards will be shortened from 54 inches to 36 inches.  The shortened bollards line 20 different driveways.

Studies conducted by Clark County in 2012 and 2015 identified issues with congestion.  The studies resulted in $5 million of improvements, including LED lights, ADA ramps, containment fencing, widening sidewalks, and removing permanent obstructions, such as signs, signposts, trash cans, and fire hydrants.  The studies also identified non-permanent obstructions causing congestion, such as street performers, vendors, handbillers, signholders, and illegal street gambling.  Modifications to non-obstruction zones and increased enforcement were implemented in order to reduce congestion.

Taxis 

Taxis are available at resorts, shopping centers, attractions, and for scheduled pickups.  The Nevada Taxicab Authority provides information about taxi fares and fare zones.  In 2021, there has been an increase in taxi passengers due to declines in rideshare drivers and rideshare surge pricing.

Rideshares 
Rideshare services, including Uber and Lyft, are available on the Strip.  In 2021, there have been reports of a lack of rideshare drivers and longer wait times due to job changes, concerns about the pandemic, and the pause in surge pricing due to the state of emergency declared by the State of Nevada.

Attractions on the Strip

Gambling 

In 2019, about eight in ten (81%) visitors said they gambled while in Las Vegas, the highest proportion in the past five years. The average time spent gambling, 2.7 hours, represents an increase over the past three years. Also, the average trip gambling budget, $591.06, was increased from 2018. About nine in ten (89%) visitors who gambled gambled on the Strip Corridor.  UNLV reported that in 2019, Big Las Vegas Strip Casinos (defined as Strip casinos with more than $72M in annual gaming revenues) had more than $6B in annual gaming revenues, corresponding to about 26% of total annual revenues.

From the time period spanning 1985 to 2019, there have been some changes in the mix of table games in casinos on the Strip:

 Blackjack: The number of tables decreased from 77% in 1985 to 50% in 2019.  Revenue decreased from 50% in 1985 to 11% in 2019.
 Craps: Revenue decreased from 28% in 1985 to 11% in 2019.
 Roulette: Both the number of tables and revenue increased by 50%.
 Baccarat: About 2% of tables and 13% revenue in 1985 to 13% of tables and 37% of revenue in 2019.
 Additional games: Games such as pai gow poker, three-card poker, and mini-baccarat have increased in popularity, number of tables, and revenue.
Casino operators have been expanding sports betting facilities and products, as well as renovating and upgrading equipment and facilities.  Although sports betting has a relatively low margin, the high-end sportsbooks can generate significant amounts of revenue in other areas, such as food and drink.  As a result, sportsbooks have been expanding and upgrading food and drink offerings.  High-end sportsbooks include features such as single-seat stadium-style seating, large high-definition screens, a dedicated broadcast booth, and the ability to watch up to 15 sporting events at once.  The sports network ESPN is broadcasting sports betting shows from a dedicated studio at The Linq.  Some sportsbooks are now offering self-service betting kiosks.

Entertainment
The Las Vegas Strip is well known for its lounges, showrooms, theaters and nightclubs; most of the attractions and shows on the Strip are located on the hotel casino properties. Some of the more popular free attractions visible from the Strip include the water fountains at  Bellagio, the volcano at The Mirage, and the Fall of Atlantis and Festival Fountain at Caesars Palace. There are several Cirque du Soleil shows, such as Kà at the MGM Grand, O at Bellagio, Mystère at Treasure Island, and Michael Jackson: One at Mandalay Bay.

Many notable artists have performed in Las Vegas, including Elvis Presley, Frank Sinatra, Wayne Newton, Dean Martin, Sammy Davis Jr. and Liberace, and in more recent years Celine Dion, Britney Spears, Barry Manilow, Cher, Elton John, Bette Midler, Diana Ross, Donny and Marie Osmond, Garth Brooks, Jennifer Lopez, Reba McEntire, Mariah Carey, Shania Twain, Criss Angel, Olivia Newton-John, Queen + Adam Lambert, Lady Gaga, and Gwen Stefani have had residencies in the various resorts on the Strip. The only movie theatre directly on the Strip was the 10-screen Regal Showcase Theatre in the Showcase Mall. The theater opened in 1997 and was operated by Regal Entertainment Group, until its closure in 2018.
During 2019, 51% of visitors attended shows, which was down from 2015, 2017, and 2018.  Among visitors who saw shows, relatively more went to Broadway/production shows than in past years, while relatively fewer saw lounge acts, comedy shows, or celebrity DJs.

Venues 
The Strip is home to many entertainment venues. Most of the resorts have a showroom, nightclub and/or live music venue on the property and a few have large multipurpose arenas. Major venues include:

All Net Resort and Arena 
The Colosseum at Caesars Palace
Las Vegas Festival Grounds
Michelob Ultra Arena
MGM Grand Garden Arena
MSG Sphere Las Vegas 
T-Mobile Arena
Zappos Theater
Allegiant Stadium

Shopping 

The Shoppes at the Palazzo featuring luxury stores.
Fashion Show Mall is adjacent to Treasure Island and opposite Wynn Las Vegas.
Grand Canal Shoppes is a luxury mall connected to The Venetian with canals, gondolas and singing gondoliers.
The LINQ Promenade is an open-air retail, dining, and entertainment district located between The Linq and Flamingo resorts that began a soft open in January 2014. It leads from a Strip-side entrance to the High Roller.
Miracle Mile Shops is part of the Planet Hollywood hotel.
The Forum Shops at Caesars is a luxury mall connected to Caesars Palace, with more than 160 shops and 11 restaurants.
Crystals at CityCenter is a luxury high-fashion mall at CityCenter.
Harmon Corner is a three-story retail center located next to Planet Hollywood with shops and restaurants.
Showcase Mall is next to MGM Grand, and displays a 100-foot Coca-Cola bottle.
 The Park, a short east–west street between the Park MGM and New York-New York resorts is a park-like boulevard lined with retail shops and restaurants, leading to T-Mobile Arena.
The Shoppes at Mandalay Place has shops and restaurants located on a sky bridge in between Mandalay Bay and Luxor.

Live sports 

Professional sports are found at venues on or near the Strip, including:

 National Football League: Las Vegas Raiders at Allegiant Stadium
 National Hockey League: Vegas Golden Knights at T-Mobile Arena
 Mixed Martial Arts: Ultimate Fighting Championship at T-Mobile Arena
 Boxing: MGM Grand Garden Arena
 Women's National Basketball Association: Las Vegas Aces at the Michelob Ultra Arena

The Strip will also become the home of the upcoming Las Vegas Grand Prix and will be part of the 2023 Formula One World Championship.

Golf

The Aladdin had a nine-hole golf course in the 1960s.  As land values on the Strip have increased over the years, the resort-affiliated golf courses have been removed to make way for building projects. The Tropicana Country Club closed in 1990 and the Dunes golf course in the mid-90s. Steve Wynn, founder of previously owned Mirage Resorts, purchased the Desert Inn and golf course for his new company Wynn Resorts and redeveloped the course as the Wynn Golf Club. This course closed in 2017, but the development planned for the course was cancelled and the course will be renovated and re-opened in late 2019.  In 2000, Bali Hai Golf Club opened just south of Mandalay Bay and the Strip.  In 2016, a TopGolf opened near the Strip.

Amusement parks and rides
The Strip is home to the Adventuredome indoor amusement park at Circus Circus.  The Adventuredome is glass-enclosed with a carousel, mini-golf, two roller coasters, bowling, spinning rides, arcade, virtual reality rides, carnival midway, and clown shows.

The Stratosphere tower has several rides:
Big Shot
X-Scream
SkyJump Las Vegas
Insanity

Other rides on the Strip include:
The Roller Coaster (also known as Big Apple Coaster)
High Roller
Fly Linq

Sustainability 

Although the Strip has elaborate displays, fountains, and large buffet restaurants, many of the hotel resort properties are renowned for their sustainability efforts, including:

 Water conservation: Approaches include reclaiming water and placing it back into Lake Mead, using minimal outdoor landscaping, upgrading toilets, using low-flow showerheads, and setting goals for water conservation.
 Recycling: In 2017, the recycling rate in Clark County was about 20%, while the recycling rate for major hotels on the Strip was about 40%.
 Food handing: Leftover food is composted or sent to agricultural farms.  Untouched, undisturbed food is donated to local food banks.
Energy efficiency: Hotels have updated appliances in rooms, installed LED lighting, and installed wireless lighting control systems.

Renewable energy is generated and used on the Strip. MGM initiated solar power when it built a solar array on top of the Mandalay Bay in 2014 and expanded it in 2016.  The solar array at the Mandalay Bay, a 28-acre system capable of powering 1,300 homes, is one of the largest commercial rooftop solar arrays in the United States.  The solar array includes more than 26,000 solar panels capable of providing a total of 8.3 megawatts DC (6.5 megawatts AC), sufficient for powering 25% of the Mandalay Bay campus.

Energy-efficient buildings are also being implemented and the Strip has one of the highest concentrations of LEED-certified buildings in the world.  Some examples of LEED-certified buildings are the Octavius Tower at Caesars Palace and the Linq Promenade, both of which are certified LEED Silver.

Locations of major landmarks

Current landmarks

Former hotel/casino locations

Demolished or closed Strip casinos and hotels

 Aladdin: Opened in 1962 as the Tallyho, became the King's Crown Tallyho in 1963, the Aladdin in 1966, and was demolished in 1998. A new Aladdin resort opened on the property in 2000, and was renamed Planet Hollywood in 2007.
 Big Red's Casino: Opened in 1981 and closed in 1982. Property developed for CBS Sports World Casino in 1997. Changed name to Sports World Casino after CBS threatened to sue. Closed in 2001, now a shopping center.
 Barbary Coast Hotel and Casino: Opened in 1978-closed in 2007, and became Bill's Gamblin' Hall until 2010. Now The Cromwell.
 Boardwalk Hotel and Casino: Closed on January 6, 2006, demolished May 9, 2006 to make way for CityCenter.
 Castaways: Opened in 1955 as the Sans Souci Hotel and became the Castaways in 1963 and was demolished in 1987. Now The Mirage.
 Desert Inn: Closed on August 28, 2000, demolished in 2004, now Wynn Las Vegas and Encore Las Vegas; Desert Inn golf course was retained and improved.
 Dunes Hotel and Casino: Closed on January 26, 1993, demolished in 1993, now Bellagio. The Dunes golf course is now occupied by parts of Park MGM, New York-New York, CityCenter, Cosmopolitan, and T-Mobile Arena.
 El Rancho (formerly Thunderbird/Silverbird): Closed in 1992 and demolished in 2000. Now the unfinished Fontainebleau Las Vegas.
 El Rancho Vegas: Burned down in 1960. The Hilton Grand Vacations Club timeshare now exists on the south edge of the site where the resort once stood; the remainder is now the Las Vegas Festival Grounds.
 Hacienda: Closed and demolished in 1996, now Mandalay Bay. Until 2015, a separate Hacienda operated outside Boulder City, formerly the Gold Strike Inn.
 Holy Cow Casino and Brewery: First micro brewery in Las Vegas. Closed in 2002, now a Walgreens store.
 Jackpot Casino: Closed in 1977, now part of Bonanza Gift Shop
 Klondike Hotel and Casino: Closed in 2006, demolished in 2008.
 Little Caesars Casino: Opened in 1970 and closed in 1994. Paris Las Vegas now occupies the area.
 Money Tree Casino: Closed in 1979, now Bonanza Gift Shop.
 Marina Hotel and Casino: Closed, adapted into MGM Grand, now the West Wing of the MGM Grand.
 New Frontier: Closed July 16, 2007, demolished November 13, 2007. Currently being redeveloped as Wynn West.
 Nob Hill Casino: Opened in 1979, and closed in 1990. Now Casino Royale
 Riviera Hotel and Casino: Opened in 1955; Closed in May 2015 to make way for the Las Vegas Global Business District.
 Royal Nevada: Opened in 1955; became part of the Stardust in 1959.
 Sands Hotel and Casino: Closed on June 30, 1996, demolished in 1996, now The Venetian.
 Silver City Casino: Closed in 1999, now the Silver City Plaza Shopping Center.
 Silver Slipper Casino: Opened in 1950 and closed and demolished in 1988. It became the parking lot for the New Frontier until its closure and demolition in 2007.
 Stardust Resort and Casino: Closed on November 1, 2006, demolished on March 13, 2007, now Resorts World.
 Vegas World: Opened in 1979, and closed in 1995. Now The Strat
 Westward Ho Hotel and Casino: Closed in 2005, demolished in 2006. Now a McDonald's.

Gallery

See also

Las Vegas
Las Vegas Boulevard
Welcome to Fabulous Las Vegas sign

References

Further reading
 Al, Stefan. The Strip: Las Vegas and the architecture of the American dream (MIT Press, 2017).

 Moehring, Eugene P. Reno, Las Vegas, and the Strip: A Tale of Three Cities (University of Nevada Press, 2014).

 Lukas, Scott A. "Theming as a sensory phenomenon: Discovering the senses on the Las Vegas strip." in The themed space: Locating culture, nation, and self (2007): 75-95.
 Song, Yang, et al. "Investigating sense of place of the Las Vegas Strip using online reviews and machine learning approaches." Landscape and Urban Planning 205 (2021): 103956.

External links

 Official Website of Las Vegas
 Las Vegas Convention and Visitors Authority

 
All-American Roads
Landmarks in Nevada
Nevada Scenic Byways
Paradise, Nevada
Streets in the Las Vegas Valley
U.S. Route 91
Shopping districts and streets in the United States
Entertainment districts in the United States
Red-light districts in Nevada